Hillsdale is a village in St. Louis County, Missouri, United States. The population was 1,478 at the 2010 census.

Geography
Hillsdale is located at  (38.683451, -90.286070).

Demographics

2010 census
As of the census of 2010, there were 1,478 people, 487 households, and 346 families living in the village. The racial makeup of the village was 2.2% White, 95.9% African American, 0.1% Native American, and 1.7% from two or more races. Hispanic or Latino of any race were 1.2% of the population.

There were 487 households, of which 46.2% had children under the age of 18 living with them, 18.3% were married couples living together, 42.7% had a female householder with no husband present, 10.1% had a male householder with no wife present, and 29.0% were non-families. 24.2% of all households were made up of individuals, and 6.2% had someone living alone who was 65 years of age or older. The average household size was 3.03 and the average family size was 3.64.

The median age in the village was 27.4 years. 35.5% of residents were under the age of 18; 11.7% were between the ages of 18 and 24; 23.4% were from 25 to 44; 22.3% were from 45 to 64; and 7.2% were 65 years of age or older. The gender makeup of the village was 44.7% male and 55.3% female.

2000 census
As of the census of 2000, there were 1,477 people, 529 households, and 368 families living in the village. The racial makeup of the village was 3.86% White, 95.40% African American, 0.14% Native American, 0.07% Asian, 0.14% from other races, and 0.41% from two or more races. Hispanic or Latino of any race were 0.14% of the population.

There were 529 households, out of which 34.6% had children under the age of 18 living with them, 21.2% were married couples living together, 40.1% had a female householder with no husband present, and 30.4% were non-families. 26.5% of all households were made up of individuals, and 7.6% had someone living alone who was 65 years of age or older. The average household size was 2.79 and the average family size was 3.39.

In the village, the population was spread out, with 33.0% under the age of 18, 11.0% from 18 to 24, 26.9% from 25 to 44, 20.7% from 45 to 64, and 8.3% who were 65 years of age or older. The median age was 30 years. For every 100 females, there were 81.7 males. For every 100 females age 18 and over, there were 73.8 males.

The median income for a household in the village was $22,159, and the median income for a family was $23,500. Males had a median income of $24,327 versus $23,594 for females. The per capita income for the village was $9,776. About 27.3% of families and 30.7% of the population were below the poverty line, including 39.5% of those under age 18 and 20.2% of those age 65 or over.

Police Department
The Hillsdale Police Department is responsible for law enforcement services in the village. The Hillsdale PD has a fleet of 3 Ford Police Interceptor Sedans, 1 Chevrolet Caprice, 1 Chevrolet Impala and 1 Ford Expedition. Hillsdale PD is dispatched by St. Louis County's 2nd Precinct Dispatch. Hillsdale officers can frequently be seen on calls along with those from Velda City.

References

Villages in St. Louis County, Missouri
Villages in Missouri